Ibrahim Mantu (16 February 1947 – 17 August 2021) was a Nigerian politician who served as the deputy senate president of Nigeria between 2003 and 2007.

Biography
He served as Deputy President of the Nigerian Senate from 2003 to 2007 and was a member of the Senate of Nigeria from 1999 till 2007.

Mantu died from COVID-19 in August 2021.

References

4. "Life and Times of Sen. Ibrahim Nasiru Mantu, CFR" https://viewpointnigeria.org/life-and-times-of-sen-ibrahim-nasiru-mantu-cfr-february-16th-1947-17th-august-2021-by-mallam-jamilu-jaafaru/ 17 August 2021.

1947 births
2021 deaths
Deaths from the COVID-19 pandemic in Nigeria
Nigerian politicians
United Nigeria Congress Party politicians
People from Plateau State